was a renowned Japanese photographer.

References

Japanese photographers
1920 births
2003 deaths
Recipients of the Medal with Purple Ribbon